Alfred Bütow (1902 – 1986) was a German art director. Originally he worked on scenic design in the theatre before switching to the film industry. He worked on the set design of over fifty films during his career.

Selected filmography
 Hearts are Trumps (1934)
 Moscow-Shanghai (1936)
 The Czar's Courier (1936)
 Alarm in Peking (1937)
 Talking About Jacqueline (1937)
 Police Report (1939)
 Mask in Blue (1943)
 The Roedern Affair (1944)
 Thank You, I'm Fine (1948)
 Search for Majora (1949)
 Madonna in Chains (1949)
 Wedding with Erika (1950)
 The Thief of Bagdad (1952)
 Fritz and Friederike (1952)
 Prosecutor Corda (1953)
 A Double Life (1954)
 The Golden Plague (1954)
 Ball of Nations (1954)
 Ripening Youth (1955)
 Inspector Hornleigh Intervenes (1961, TV series)

References

Bibliography
 Rolf Giesen. Nazi Propaganda Films: A History and Filmography. McFarland, 2003.

External links

1902 births
1986 deaths
German art directors
Film people from Berlin